Somtane is a railway station on the Panvel–Roha route of Central Railway in India. It is at a distance of 73.3 km from Chhatrapati Shivaji Terminus via . Its station code is SMNE. It belongs to the Mumbai division of Central Railway.

The station is situated in Raigad district of Navi Mumbai, Maharashtra.

References

Railway stations in Raigad district
Mumbai Suburban Railway stations
Panvel-Roha rail line